Popov is a rural locality (a khutor) in Zakharovskoye Rural Settlement, Chernyshkovsky District, Volgograd Oblast, Russia. The population was 318 as of 2010. There are 12 streets.

Geography 
Popov is located on the bank of the Tsimlyansk Reservoir, 60 km southeast of Chernyshkovsky (the district's administrative centre) by road. Vodyanovsky is the nearest rural locality.

References 

Rural localities in Chernyshkovsky District